Abid Thiyab Al-Ajeeli (born 1950) is the current Iraqi Minister of Higher Education and Scientific Research in the government of Nouri al-Maliki. He was elected as part of the Sunni Arab-majority Iraqi Accord Front and is a member of the Iraqi Islamic Party.

In November 2006 he announced his "temporary resignation" from the government in protest at a mass abduction by people in police uniforms of people from the ministry of higher education and scientific research building.

Abid Al-Ajeeli finished his BSc in Operations research from Southampton University, England in 1976. In 1977, he earned his MSc from the same university, and earned his PhD from Keele University, England in 1990.

References
 Minister quits in protest over Iraq kidnaps

1950 births
Living people
Alumni of the University of Southampton
Alumni of Keele University
Iraqi Islamic Party politicians
Government ministers of Iraq